Samantha Page was a newscaster on Naked News.  She was born and raised in England, and graduated in psychology and zoology, while also earning a black belt in Shotokan karate. She joined the cast in February 2003, becoming the first British newscaster, and left the show in August 2005.

References

External links 
 

British television presenters
Canadian television news anchors
Living people
British women television journalists
Canadian women television journalists
1983 births
British women television presenters
Canadian women television hosts